Masudaya, also known as Masudaya Modern Toys, is a Japanese toy maker which became known as a leading builder of mechanical and battery operated toys in the post World War II era. Unlike most of their competitors, this company has managed to survive to this day, in part due to their involvement in the early days of the airsoft boom, during the early 1980s. The company was known for essentially creating the "skirmishable" airsoft gun. They were the first to design airsoft guns to be used for combat simulation. Before that, all airsoft guns were essentially for backyard target shooting.

Masudaya normally identifies their toys using the M-T, or Modern Toys logo. Most of the guns they produced, but especially the TradeMark series, are extremely rare. The Detachable series are the most common, followed by the Bolt series. Many sources in the airsoft community in Hong Kong and Japan believe there are only a handful of each version of TradeMark guns left in existence. Also, some Masudaya guns can be seen packaged either as Masudaya or TradeMark. An example of this is the Thunderbolt, where some versions say "TradeMark" on the box and others just say Masudaya.

Products
Masudaya has produced hundreds of toys through the years, many of them vintage tin type toys either wind-up or battery-operated, in addition to the following Airsoft replicas:
 Assembly Rifle
 SWAT Shotgun
 Minuteman-10 Rifle
 ZAP-20 Rifle
 Recoiler Sniper Rifle
BS Buffalo and Detachable Series:
 Buffalo SS Rifle (sold under tradeMark sometimes)
 Detachable SS-2
 Detachable SS-2 Briefcase
 Detachable SS-02
 Detachable SS-3
 Detachable SS-3 Briefcase
 Detachable SS-03
 detachable SS-4
 Detachable SS-4 Briefcase
 Detachable SS-5
 Detachable SS-5 Briefcase
 Detachable SS-100
 Detachable SS-200
Bolt Series:
 Bolt 888
 Bolt 888 MK2
 Thunderbolt
 Urchin M16

Masudaya also produced a small line of guns under their "TradeMark Air Guns" name. These guns included:

 Luger MS-1
 Walther P38 MS-1
 Magnum MS-1
 Falcon-077
 Falcon GV-078

References

External links
 Masudaya official site

Toy weapons
Toy companies of Japan